Lesbia was a figure in Roman poetry.

Lesbia can also refer to:

Lesbia (play), an 1888 play by Richard Davey
Lesbia (bird), a hummingbird genus
Lesbia Harford (1891-1927), an Australian poet
Lesbia Vent Dumois (b. 1932), a Cuban artist
A nickname for Julia Livilla (18 - late 41 or early 42), used by Robert Graves in his Claudius novels

See also
Catocala lesbia, a species of moth
Acalyptris lesbia, a species of moth
Lesbian (disambiguation)